Goodnight Already! is a children's book series by American author Jory John, illustrated by Benji Davies and published by HarperCollins. The series includes four books: Goodnight Already! (2014), I Love You Already! (2015), Come Home Already! (2017), and All Right Already! (2018).

Goodnight Already! 
Goodnight Already! was published December 2, 2014.

The book received positive reviews from Booklist and Publishers Weekly, as well as a mediocre review from Kirkus Reviews. It also received the following accolades:

 Goodreads Choice Award Nominee for Picture Books (2015)
 E. B. White Read-Aloud Honor Book (2015)

I Love You Already! 
I Love You Already! was published December 22, 2015.

The book received positive reviews from Publishers Weekly and Booklist, as well as a mediocre review from Kirkus Reviews.

Come Home Already! 
Come Home Already! was published December 5, 2017.

The book received a positive review from Kirkus Reviews and was named one of Bank Street College of Education's Best Children's Books of the Year (2018).

All Right Already! 
All Right Already! was published November 13, 2018.

The book received a positive review from School Library Journal.

References 

HarperCollins books
Series of children's books
2014 children's books
American picture books
Book series introduced in 2014